Negative Space is a 2017 French stop motion animated short film by Max Porter and Ru Kuwahata. It was nominated for the Academy Award for Best Animated Short Film at the 90th Academy Awards. It is based on a poem by Ron Koertge.

Plot
A nostalgic look at a father (a traveling businessman) and his complicated relationship with his left-behind son alongside the efficient skill of packing.

Reception
On review aggregator website Rotten Tomatoes, the film has an approval rating of 100% based on 15 reviews, and an average rating of 8.40/10.

Accolades
 Academy Award for Best Animated Short Film nomination (2017)
 Best Animated Short: Richmond International Film & Music Festival (2018)

References

External links
 
 
 

French animated films
2017 films
2017 animated films
2010s French films